Don McLean Sings Marty Robbins is an album by American singer-songwriter Don McLean, released in 2001. It consists of songs written by or recorded by country music singer-songwriter Marty Robbins.

Track listing
 "Singin' the Blues" (Melvin Endsley) – 2:22
 "Kaw-Liga" (Fred Rose, Hank Williams) – 2:56
 "Among My Souvenirs" (Edgar Leslie, Horatio Nicholls) – 4:25
 "Don't Worry 'Bout Me" (Marty Robbins) – 4:58
 "Ribbon of Darkness" (Gordon Lightfoot) – 2:42
 "The Story of My Life" (Burt Bacharach, Hal David) – 3:05
 "El Paso" (Robbins) – 5:30
 "I Can't Quit" (Robbins) – 2:31
 "Love Me" (Jeanne Pruett) – 4:31
 "Devil Woman" (Robbins) – 4:51
 "Time Goes By" (Robbins) – 2:49
 "You Gave Me a Mountain" (Robbins) – 4:33

References

Don McLean albums
2001 albums
Covers albums